Clarice "Dollie" McLean (born 1936) is founding executive director of the Artists Collective, Inc. of Hartford, Connecticut. McLean, born Clarice Helene Simmons in Antigua, West Indies, was raised in Manhattan, New York. She studied dance under Katherine Dunham, Jon Leone Destine, Asadata Dafora, and Martha Graham. In 1970 she and her husband Jackie McLean (whose vision and concept was the Artists Collective) enlisted local artists bassist Paul (PB) Brown, dancer Cheryl Smith, and visual artist Ionis Martin to join them in establishing the Artists Collective, Inc. in Hartford, Connecticut.

See also
 Artists Collective, Inc.
 Jackie McLean
 Paul H. Brown

Sources
Connecticut Women's Hall of Fame 
Official history of the Artists Collective Inc.
History of the Artists Collective Inc.
Connecticut Historical Society

References

Living people
American female dancers
Dancers from Connecticut
African-American dancers
African-American actresses
1936 births
21st-century African-American people
21st-century African-American women
20th-century African-American people
20th-century African-American women